"feel like shit" is a song by Canadian singer Tate McRae, released on November 11, 2021, by RCA Records as the lead single from her debut studio album I Used to Think I Could Fly (2022). The song was produced by Russell Chell and Jasper Harris, and written by McRae, Jacob Kasher, Russell Chell and Victoria Zaro.

Background and release
McRae first teased the song via a TikTok on September 30, 2021, and continued to tease the song throughout the month of October, promising to release the song after 20,000 people pre-saved the single. She announced the release date on November 3, 2021. In the description for the music video, McRae remarked, "i wrote this song about a very personal experience and then michelle dawley and i brought it to life in this music video. i can’t explain how excited i am for you all to see this video and experience the ups and downs of a relationship in 3 minutes."

Critical reception
The song received positive reviews from critics, praising the lyrics and vocal performance. Writing for ET Canada, Mikael Melo described the song and music video as McRae's best work to date, nothing that the song showcases McRae's "mature and gifted voice" while the music video adds "an incredible layer to this song, with incredible story telling and thought provoking choreography". Larisha Paul of The Fader remarked that "McRae falls into the track like Alice in Wonderland, letting her guard down to open up to doors for that uncomplicated and raw delivery throughout." Sam Murphy of music magazine The Interns called McRae "the dark princess of pop", noting that she has perfected a moody formula and the song hits exactly where it should. Carolyn Droke of Uproxx described the song as an "earnest solo tune about the ups and downs of a relationship." Elise Shafer of Variety stated that the song is  "raw and vulnerable, with McRae’s powerful voice soaring over an instrumental led by drums and keys."

Music video
The music video was described in the press release for the song as McRae's most choreographed video to date and features McRae performing an intense and emotional contemporary routine alongside actor and dancer Mason Cutler, both portraying servers at a restaurant. The choreography depicts the emotional turmoil of heartbreak showcasing McRae and Cutler continually being drawn back to each other in a seemingly fraught relationship, despite their attempts to let go. Ellise Shafer of Variety remarked that "the push and pull of the choreography fittingly matches the song’s message of letting a loved one go before you’re truly ready." As McRae and Cutler dance across the restaurant, the video reaches a climax when Cutler begins smashing plates, and the pair continue dancing intertwined movements over the broken ceramic. The video concludes with Cutler finally walking away, leaving McRae hunched over in emotional distress. McRae remarked about the video, "This is the first time that I am fully dancing in one of my own music videos, therefore I feel like I was really able to tell the story of the aftermath of a breakup through what I know best; movement.”

Credits
Credits adapted from Tidal and YouTube.

Song

 Tate McRae – vocals, composer, lyricist
 Jacob Kasher Hindlin – composer, lyricist
 Jasper Harris – producer
 Russell Chell – composer, lyricist, producer
 Dave Kutch – mastering engineer
 Dave Cook – mixing engineer, engineer, recording engineer
 Jeff Juliano – mixing engineer

Music video

 Mason Cutler – co-star
 Sam Sulam – director
 Maximilian Kurzwell – executive producer
 Abi Perl – producer
 AB Films – production
 Jenna Marsh – creative director
 Art Brainard – assistant director
 David Okolo – director of photography
 Daniel Worlock – AC
 Natalie Abraham – second AC
 Nicky Keros – MM + editor
 Niels Lindelien – Trinity op
 Michelle Dawley – creative lead, choreographer
 Noelle Marsh – choreographer
 Jason Glover – body double
 Alexah Acuna – production designer 
 Parhom Jamshidi – art director
 Per Alexah – art assistant
 Eric Heresy – set dresser 
 Angela Rojas – art assistant
 Katie Qian – stylist
 Julianne Sevilla – stylist assistant
 Ryan Richman – Tate McRae hair
 Gilbert Soliz – Tate McRae make-up
 Alexa Hernandez – Mason Cutler groomer
 Justin Smith – CCO
 Milan Nikolik – VFX
 Gregory Reese – color grade
 Michael Tanji – beauty post
 Jordan Marks – title design
 Sabrina Rivera – video commissioner

Charts

Certifications

Release history

References

2021 singles
2021 songs
Tate McRae songs
RCA Records singles
Songs written by Tate McRae